The following list of Austrian states by gross domestic product sorts the states of Austria (Bundesländer)  according to their economic output.

States by GDP 
Austrian states by GDP in the year 2018 in Euro.

States by GDP per capita

Development of GDP

Development of GDP per capita

References 

Gross state product
States by GDP
Austria